Jyrki Heikki Järvi (born 7 February 1966, in Helsinki) is a Finnish sailor and Olympic champion. Nicknamed "JJ", Järvi won a gold medal in the 49er Class with Thomas Johanson at the 2000 Summer Olympics in Sydney.

References

External links
 
 
 

1966 births
Living people
Finnish male sailors (sport)
Sailors at the 2000 Summer Olympics – 49er
Olympic sailors of Finland
Olympic gold medalists for Finland
Sportspeople from Helsinki
Olympic medalists in sailing
Medalists at the 2000 Summer Olympics